Francis Walter Flack  (b Cambridge 22 May 1859; d Uitenhage 25 June 1933) was an Anglican priest in the last two decades of the nineteenth century and the first three of the Twentieth, most notably Archdeacon of Port Elizabeth from 1919 until his death.

Edwardes was educated at St Catharine's College, Cambridge. He was ordained deacon in 1883, and priest in 1884. After a curacy in Shildon he went out to South Africa.He served at Port Alfred, Port Elizabeth and Uitenhage.

References

Archdeacons of Port Elizabeth
Alumni of St Catharine's College, Cambridge
19th-century South African Anglican priests
20th-century South African Anglican priests
1859 births
People from Cambridge
1933 deaths